Rihaee may refer to:

 Rihaee (film), a 1988 Hindi film directed by Aruna Raje
 Rihaee (TV series) (2005), Indian television crime series that aired on Sony TV
 Rihaee (1954 film), a 1954 Bollywood film